Antonio Téllez Solá (January 18, 1921, Tarragona – March 27, 2005, Perpignan) was a Catalan anarchist, journalist and historian.

Selected works 
Téllez, Antonio. Anarchist International Action Against Francoism From Genoa 1949 to The First Of May Group 
Téllez, Antonio. Sabaté: Guerrilla Extraordinary 
Téllez, Antonio. The Anarchist Resistance to Franco

Further reading 

 Gordon, Tom (1975), review of Sabaté: Guerrilla Extraordinary, in Burnett, Ray (ed.), Calgacus 1, Winter 1975, p. 61,

External links 
Articles by and photos of Téllez at the Kate Sharpley Library

1921 births
2005 deaths
People from Tarragona
Politicians from Catalonia
French Resistance members
Spanish anarchists
Spanish military personnel of the Spanish Civil War (Republican faction)
Historians of anarchism
Anarchist partisans
20th-century Spanish journalists
Spanish emigrants to France